Clear Secure, Inc. (operating as: CLEAR) is an American technology company that operates biometric travel document verification system at some major airports and stadiums.

History

Origin and founders 
Steven Brill and Ajay Amlani were original owners of Clear, a subsidiary of Verified Identity Pass, founded in 2003. Ajay Amlani left the company in 2006 to pursue another identity technology company named YOU Technology. Steven Brill stepped away from the company in 2008.  Clear shut down in 2009 after filing for bankruptcy.

2010s 
Caryn Seidman-Becker purchased CLEAR out of bankruptcy in 2010 with her partner and co-founder Ken Cornick. They relaunched the company in 2012. Clear operates out of its headquarters in Manhattan, New York.

Caryn Seidman-Becker and Ken Cornick saw Clear as a promising business to pursue based on the fact that they believed the market for surveillance and security would rise due to the catastrophic events that happened on 9/11.

2020s 
In 2021, Clear went public as Clear Secure, Inc. on the NYSE with the ticker symbol ‘YOU’.

In January 2023, Clear celebrated the launch of security lanes at its 50th airport, Raleigh-Durham International Airport.  It followed that up with new lanes at Kansas City International Airport at the end of February 2023.

Corporate affairs

Patents 
The company has received patents for “physical token-less security screening using biometrics”, which allows a person to be identified using their individual and distinctive biometric identity that the company creates. The company has been successful in filing and receiving several patents throughout the years. On February 4, 2020, the company was granted the ability to ticket people through their biometric identities. Prior to this patent, the company was also granted two patents on January 14, 2020, to conduct pre-identification before an individual approached the stationed device and to use individual biometric identities to expedite interactions with people in the close vicinity. To simplify and expedite the process even further, on December 31, 2019, the company was granted a patent to use mobile devices in enrolling into the system.

CLEAR has partnerships with the European company Oberthur Technologies. Oberthur provides CLEAR with identification cards encoded with information that is beyond a normal ID card. They follow the federal standards for Personal Identity Verification (PIV).

Anti-terrorism 
In June 2012, CLEAR received certification under the SAFETY Act (Support Anti-Terrorism by Fostering Effective Technologies Act of 2002) by the United States Department of Homeland Security.

Marketing and collaborations 
CLEAR has partnerships with Airlines and Stadiums. The airline currently partners with Delta Air Lines, United Airlines, and Alaska Airlines. This includes partnerships with Major League Baseball and National Football League.
CLEAR has also partnered with Lyft which grants people a 3-month free trial to test out CLEAR and gives them a $20 voucher for Lyft customers to use towards a trip to any airport.

CLEAR had a former partnership with car rental company Hertz, until the company declared bankrupt.

Revenue 
The company charges its customers $189 per year for a premium program named CLEAR Plus, however, it can be lowered if the user is a member of Delta SkyMiles®, United MileagePlus®, or holds an American Express Centurion, Platinum, or Green Card. This Membership allows them to skip past long lines, no matter if they are at a stadium, an arena, or an airport. By expanding and diversifying their locations, CLEAR also receives additional revenue from sports teams, who pay licensing fees.

Awards 
In June 2019, Clear CEO Caryn Seidman-Becker and President Ken Cornick were given the 2019 EY Entrepreneur Of The Year Award for the New York Region.

References



Security companies of the United States
Technology companies established in 2010